Kendall Jagdeosingh (born May 30, 1986 in Manzanilla) is a Trinidadian footballer who currently plays for Ayutthaya in Thai League 3

Career

Club
Jagdeosingh began his career in his native Trinidad, playing four seasons for North East Stars and Caledonia AIA in the TT Pro League.

Jagdeosingh joined the Puerto Rico Islanders in the USL First Division in 2007. He helped the Islanders win the 2008 USL First Division regular season title and progressed to the semi finals of the CONCACAF Champions League 2008–09.

On February 16, 2011, Jagdeosingh signed with Rochester Rhinos of the third division USL Pro league. The contract is for one year with a club option for 2012.

In March 2012, Jagdeosing signed with Chainat F.C. alongside fellow Trinidad national Yohance Marshall.

International
Jagdeosingh played for the Trinidadian national U-20 U-21 U-23 team, and was part of the Trinidad squad which competed at the 2007 CONCACAF Gold Cup. He also participated in several of Trinidad's early qualifying games for the 2010 FIFA World Cup, and qualifying games for the 2014 FIFA World Cup and an international friendly against Finland on January 22, 2012.

Honors

Puerto Rico Islanders
USSF Division 2 Pro League Champions (1): 2010
Commissioner's Cup Winners (1): 2008
CFU Club Championship Winner (1): 2010

References

External links
 Puerto Rico Islanders bio

1986 births
Living people
Trinidad and Tobago footballers
North East Stars F.C. players
TT Pro League players
Morvant Caledonia United players
Puerto Rico Islanders players
USL First Division players
Expatriate footballers in Puerto Rico
2007 CONCACAF Gold Cup players
Trinidad and Tobago expatriate sportspeople in Puerto Rico
USSF Division 2 Professional League players
Rochester New York FC players
USL Championship players
Trinidad and Tobago people of Indian descent
Expatriate footballers in Thailand
Kendall Jagdeosingh
Kendall Jagdeosingh
Kendall Jagdeosingh
Association football forwards
Trinidad and Tobago expatriate sportspeople in Thailand
Kendall Jagdeosingh
Trinidad and Tobago international footballers